Asier Martínez Echarte (born 22 April 2000) is a Spanish athlete who specializes in the 110m hurdles.

In 2021 he became the Spanish indoor champion and finished fourth in the 60 metres hurdles at the 2021 European Athletics Indoor Championships with a new personal best time of 7.60 seconds.

On 15 May 2021 in Castellón, he beat his personal best in the 110 metres hurdles with a time of 13.34s, just before winning the 110 m hurdles race at the 2021 European Athletics Team Championships.

In June 2021, he booked his place at the delayed 2020 Summer Olympics by finishing second in the Spanish national championships and meeting the qualifying standard time.

Personal bests

Outdoors
 110 Metres Hurdles:	13.14 (Munich, 2022)

Indoors
 60 Metres Hurdles:	7.60 (Torun, 2021)

International competitions

References

External links
 
 
 
 

2000 births
Living people
Spanish male hurdlers
Athletes (track and field) at the 2020 Summer Olympics
Olympic athletes of Spain
European Athletics Championships winners
Sportspeople from Navarre
People from Cuenca de Pamplona